Potomac Mills may refer to:
Potomac Mills (shopping mall) in Woodbridge, Virginia
Potomac Mills, Prince William County, Virginia
Potomac Mills, Westmoreland County, Virginia
Potomac Mills (Shepherdstown, West Virginia)